Lauren Marie Socha (born 9 June 1990) is an English actress. She rose to prominence during her role as Kelly Bailey in the E4 comedy-drama television series Misfits, for which she won a BAFTA TV Award in the Best Supporting Actress category. She is also known for her role in the Channel 4 television film The Unloved.

Early life
Socha was born in Derby, Derbyshire to Robert and Kathleen (née Lyons) Socha. Her mother is English and her father was British of Polish/Italian parents. She has an older brother, Michael Socha, also an actor. She attended St. George's RC Primary School, Burton College and St. Benedict's Catholic School and Performing Arts College, Derby. She trained at the Central Junior Television Workshop based in Nottingham.

Career
Socha was first recognised by agents and casting directors when she attended a local drama workshop, having been inspired by her older brother. This led to her being cast as the lead in the Arctic Monkeys' video for their 2006 single "When the Sun Goes Down" at the age of 15.

In 2009, Socha went on to star in Samantha Morton's directorial debut The Unloved in which she played a sixteen-year-old girl in a care home. She was nominated for a BAFTA for Best Supporting Actress for her role. A week later she auditioned for the role of Kelly Bailey in British comedy drama Misfits and got the part.

In 2010, Socha starred alongside Tim McInnerny in the short film Missing. She also had a minor role in the television mini-series Five Daughters, based on the Ipswich serial murders.

In May 2011, she won a BAFTA in the Best Supporting Actress category for her role of Kelly in Misfits. Socha was nominated for Outstanding Actress in the fiction category at the Monte-Carlo Television Festival in 2011.  She later appeared in the short The Child, playing a version of Marilyn Monroe. She also took part in the BBC learning project "Off By Heart Shakespeare" where she played Juliet from Romeo and Juliet, performing the speech: "Blistered be thy tongue".

She also appeared in five episodes of Catastrophe as the babysitter and in 2017 and 2020 played one of the sisters in comedy series The Other One.

Personal life
Socha lives in Derby. She has three tattoos: three stars on her neck, a bow on her back and her initials with a star on her wrist, which her parents allowed her to have done. Her brother, Michael Socha, is also an actor.

In April 2016, it was announced via Twitter that she had given birth to a girl.

Criminal conviction
On 23 January 2012, it was reported that Socha had been charged with racially aggravated assault in connection with an incident involving a Derby taxi driver the previous October. On 2 May 2012, Socha pleaded guilty to the charge, and was sentenced to four months in prison, suspended for 12 months. The taxi driver had an eight-minute voice recording of Socha's rant, and said to reporters after the verdict: "She called me a P***, a dirty b****** and said: 'You're Asian, f*** off back to where you came from.' She said: 'Do you know who I am? I'll have your family lifted.'"

Filmography

Awards and nominations

References

External links
 

1990 births
21st-century English actresses
Living people
English film actresses
English television actresses
Actresses from Derbyshire
Alumni of Burton College
People from Derby
People convicted of racial hatred offences
English people convicted of assault
English people of Portuguese descent
British people convicted of hate crimes
Best Supporting Actress BAFTA Award (television) winners
English people of Italian descent
English people of Polish descent